Nizhniye Lubyanki is a rural locality (a selo) in Volokonovsky District, Belgorod Oblast, Russia. The population was 619 as of 2010. There are 5 streets.

Geography 
Nizhniye Lubyanki is located 5 km southwest of Volokonovka (the district's administrative centre) by road. Volokonovka is the nearest rural locality.

References 

Rural localities in Volokonovsky District